Emelin or Yemelin (Russian: Емелин) is a Russian masculine surname; its feminine counterpart is Emelina or Yemelina. It may refer to:

Alexei Emelin (born 1986), Russian ice hockey defenceman 
Aleksey Yemelin (born 1968), Soviet high jumper
Anatoly Emelin (born 1964), Russian ice hockey player
Andrei Emelin (born 1967), Russian scouting official
Sergei Yemelin (born 1991), Russian ice hockey player
Vasily Yemelin (born 1976), Russian chess player

Other uses
Emelin Theatre, in Mamaroneck, New York, U.S.
The Spanish language equivalent of the given name Emily

See also
Emeline (disambiguation)

Russian-language surnames